Hartley Hendrick Hethcox (April 17, 1895 – May 6, 1958) was an American politician.

Hethcox was born on April 17, 1895, in Paisley, Florida. He settled in Umatilla and became a melon farmer. He became involved in local politics serving ten years each as a city councilor in Umatilla, and on the Lake County Commission, as well as twelve years as a trustee of a school. Hethcox served as a Democratic member of the Florida House of Representatives from 1947 to 1949. He died in Eustis, Florida, on May 6, 1958.

References

1895 births
1958 deaths
20th-century American politicians
Farmers from Florida
Democratic Party members of the Florida House of Representatives
People from Umatilla, Florida
Florida city council members
County commissioners in Florida